The 2016–17 Czech First League, known as the ePojisteni.cz liga for sponsorship reasons, was the 24th season of the Czech Republic's top-tier football league. Slavia Prague won the league, while defending champions Viktoria Plzeň finished in second place. The season began on 29 July 2016 and ended on 27 May 2017.

Teams

Stadiums and locations

Personnel and kits

Managerial changes

League table

Results

Top scorers

Attendances

These are the average attendances of all the top division teams.

See also
 2016–17 Czech Cup
 2016–17 Czech National Football League

References

External links
  

2016–17 in European association football leagues
1
2016-17